Sinbo was a minister who served the kings in Gaya confederacy. Queen Mojong who was the second wife of Geodeung of Geumgwan Gaya was his daughter. He served as government officer of Gaya confederacy. In 48, when Heo Hwang-ok came over from India to Gaya confederacy, he also came from India as an attendant of Heo Hwang-ok who married into Gaya confederacy.

Family 
Daughter: Queen Mojong

References 

Korean people of Indian descent
Gaya confederacy
Gaya confederacy people
Year of birth unknown
201 deaths